is a passenger railway station  located in the city of  Ashiya Hyōgo Prefecture, Japan. It is operated by the private transportation company Hanshin Electric Railway.

Lines

Layout
The station consists of two opposed ground-level  side platforms connected by an underground passage.

Platforms

History 
Uchide Station opened on 12 April 1905 along with the rest of the Hanshin Main Line.

On 12 January 1995, the station was damaged by the Great Hanshin earthquake. Service in the affected area was restored by 26 June 1995.

Station numbering was introduced on 21 December 2013, with Uchide being designated as station number HS-19.

Passenger statistics
In fiscal 2019, the station was used by an average of 13,564 passengers daily

Surrounding area
Uchideten Shrine
Kanazuyama Kofun
Ashiya City Uchide Education and Culture Center
 Ashiya City Library Uchide branch  (芦屋市立図書館打出分室, See also 旧松山家住宅松濤館)

See also
List of railway stations in Japan

References

External links

  Uchide Station website 

Railway stations in Japan opened in 1905
Railway stations in Hyōgo Prefecture
Hanshin Main Line
Ashiya, Hyōgo